Westfield is a city in Plymouth County, Iowa, United States. The population was 123 at the time of the 2020 census.  It is the westernmost point in Iowa, this being due to a bend in the Big Sioux River.  The nearby Broken Kettle wildlife refuge is one of the few places in Iowa where prairie rattlesnakes are commonly found.

Westfield is the purported home town of the central character, Jack Smurch, in James Thurber's 1931 short story "The Greatest Man in the World." In the story, the fictional Smurch flies a second-hand, single-motored monoplane in July 1937 all the way around the world, without stopping.

Geography
Westfield is located at  (42.755884, -96.604050).

Demographics

2010 census
As of the census of 2010, there were 132 people, 54 households, and 37 families living in the city. The racial makeup of the city was 87.1% White, 3.8% Native American, 3.0% from other races, and 6.1% from two or more races. Hispanic or Latino of any race were 5.3% of the population.

There were 54 households, of which 33.3% had children under the age of 18 living with them, 51.9% were married couples living together, 5.6% had a female householder with no husband present, 11.1% had a male householder with no wife present, and 31.5% were non-families. 29.6% of all households were made up of individuals, and 9.3% had someone living alone who was 65 years of age or older. The average household size was 2.44 and the average family size was 3.00.

The median age in the city was 39.5 years. 23.5% of residents were under the age of 18; 9.9% were between the ages of 18 and 24; 25% were from 25 to 44; 30.2% were from 45 to 64; and 11.4% were 65 years of age or older. The gender makeup of the city was 51.5% male and 48.5% female.

2000 census
As of the census of 2000, there were 189 people, 74 households, and 54 families living in the city. The racial makeup of the city was 89.42% White, 3.70% Native American, 1.06% Asian, 0.53% from other races, and 5.29% from two or more races. Hispanic or Latino of any race were 2.12% of the population.

There were 74 households, out of which 33.8% had children under the age of 18 living with them, 54.1% were married couples living together, 14.9% had a female householder with no husband present, and 25.7% were non-families. 24.3% of all households were made up of individuals, and 9.5% had someone living alone who was 65 years of age or older. The average household size was 2.55 and the average family size was 2.93.

Age spread: 24.3% under the age of 18, 7.9% from 18 to 24, 28.6% from 25 to 44, 24.3% from 45 to 64, and 14.8% who were 65 years of age or older. The median age was 37 years. For every 100 females, there were 110.0 males. For every 100 females age 18 and over, there were 104.3 males.

The median income for a household in the city was $28,929, and the median income for a family was $35,833. Males had a median income of $29,000 versus $17,500 for females. The per capita income for the city was $15,211. About 3.8% of families and 3.6% of the population were below the poverty line, including 6.7% of those under the age of eighteen and none of those 65 or over.

Education
The Akron–Westfield Community School District operates area public schools. The district formed on July 1, 1981, as a merger of the Akron and Westfield school districts. Akron–Westfield Senior High School is the local high school.

References

Cities in Plymouth County, Iowa
Cities in Iowa